Garfield County Courthouse may refer to:

Garfield County Courthouse (Oklahoma), Enid, Oklahoma
Garfield County Courthouse (Washington), Pomeroy, Washington